This is a list of actors from Albania, a country in Europe's Balkan Peninsula. The chronological list by year of birth also includes actors from Kosovo, Montenegro, North Macedonia and select actors of Albanian ancestry from around the world.

Male actors

 Aleksandër Moisiu (1879–1935)
 Pjetër Gjoka (1912–1982)
 Sandër Prosi (1920–1985)
 Pandi Raidhi (1921–1999)
 Naim Frashëri (1923–1975)
 Kadri Roshi (1924–2007)
 Sulejman Pitarka (1924–2007)
 Ndrek Luca (1927–1995)
 Luan Qerimi (1929-2018)
 Skënder Sallaku (1935–2014)
 Bekim Fehmiu (1936–2010)
 Albert Vërria (1936–2015)
 Dhimitër Orgocka (1936–2021)
 Faruk Begolli (1944–2007)
 Edmond Budina (1952)
 James Belushi (1954)
 John Belushi (1949–1982)
 James Biberi (1965)
 Blerim Destani (1981)
 Mike Dusi (1981)
 Victor Gojcaj (1983)
 Agim Kaba (1980)
 Peter Malota (1959)
 Nickola Shreli (1981)
 Robert Ndrenika (1942)
 Enver Petrovci (1954)
 Nik Xhelilaj (1983)
 Esat Teliti (1950)
 Erbi Ago (1990)
 Reshat Arbana (1940)
 Ilir Jaçellari (1970)
 Laert Vasili (1974)
 Roland Trebicka (1947–2013)
 Llazi Sërbo (1945–2010)
 Agim Qirjaqi (1950–2010)
 Andon Qesari (1942–2021)
 Aleko Prodani (1942–2006)
 Bujar Lako (1946–2016)
 Ndriçim Xhepa (1957)
 Vasillaq Vangjeli (1948–2011)
  Agim Shuka (1942-1992)
  Orli Shuka (1976-Present)

Female actors

 Marie Logoreci (1920–1988)
 Ferial Alibali (1923–2011)
 Liza Vorfi (1924–2011)
 Violeta Manushi (1926–2007)
 Drita Pelingu (1926–2013)
 Melpomeni Çobani (1928–2016)
 Esma Agolli (1928–2010)
 Margarita Xhepa (1932)
 Tinka Kurti (1932)
 Melihate Ajeti (1935–2005)
 Antoneta Papapavli (1938–2013)
 Yllka Mujo (1953)
 Rajmonda Bulku (1958)
 Luiza Xhuvani (1964)
 Luli Bitri (1976)
 Masiela Lusha (1985)
 Flonja Kodheli
 Ana Golja (1996)

See also

 List of Albanian films
 List of Albanians

References

Albanian actors
Albania
Actors